Woo-sung is a Korean male given name. The meaning differs based on the hanja used. There are 42 hanja with the reading "woo" and 27 hanja with the reading "sung" on the South Korean government's official list of hanja which may be used in given names.

People with this name include:
Hyun Woo-sung (born 1979), South Korean actor
Jung Woo-sung (born 1973), South Korean actor and director
Kam Woo-sung (born 1970), South Korean actor
Lee Woo-sung (born 1984), South Korean baseball player
Kim Woo-sung (alpine skier) (born 1986), South Korean alpine skier
Kim Woo-sung (singer) (born 1993), American singer of Korean descent, member of The Rose

See also
List of Korean given names

References

Korean masculine given names